Mujauna is a village in West Champaran district in the Indian state of Bihar. It comes under the Shikarpur panchayat of Narkatiaganj block.

Demographics
As of 2011 India census, Mujauna had a population of 901 in 121 households. Males constitute 52% of the population and females 47%. Mujauna has an average literacy rate of 42%, lower than the national average of 74%: male literacy is 67.28%, and female literacy is 32.71%. In Mujauna, 20.4% of the population is under 6 years of age.

References

Villages in West Champaran district